Joel Martínez may refer to:

 Joel Martínez (footballer, born 1988), Andorran international footballer
 Joel Martínez (footballer, born 1996), Argentine footballer
 Joel Fido Martínez (born 1981), Puerto Rican musician of the reggaeton duo Alexis & Fido
 Joel Neftali Martinez (born 1940), Hispanic-American Bishop of the United Methodist Church
 Walter Joel Martínez (born 1991), Honduran international footballer
 The Kid Mero (Joel Martinez, born 1983), Dominican-American writer, comedian, TV personality and voice actor

See also
 Joe L. Martínez
 Joel (given name)
 Martínez (surname)